The 2010-11 Serbian Hockey League season was the 20th season of the Serbian Hockey League, the top level of ice hockey in Serbia. Four teams participated in the league, and HK Vojvodina Novi Sad won the championship.

Regular season

Playoffs

Semifinal
 HK Vojvodina Novi Sad – KHK Crvena Zvezda 6:7/4:10

Final 
 KHK Crvena Zvezda – HK Spartak Subotica 7:2/5:0 Forfeit

Superfinal 
 HK Partizan Belgrade – KHK Crvena Zvezda 4:2/11:1

External links
 2010–11 season

Serbian Hockey League
Serbian Hockey League seasons
Serbian Hockey League